William Hardin Burnley (21 April 1780 – 29 December 1850) was an American-born British-Trinidadian planter who was the largest slave-owner in Trinidad in the nineteenth century.

Born in New York City, he was the son of Hardin Burnley (1741–1823) and his wife, Catherine, née Maitland (1752/3–1827). The family moved to London in 1786, and Burnley attended Harrow School in 1793. He visited Trinidad in 1793, and eventually settled on the island.

Selected publications
 Observations on the present condition of the island of Trinidad, and the actual state of the experiment of negro emancipation, 1842.

See also
 Hardin Burnley

References

Further reading
 Cudjoe, Selwyn R. (2018), The Slave Master of Trinidad. University of Massachusetts Press.

External links 
Selwyn R. Cudjoe, "William Hardin Burnley and Caribbean slavery" (audio), 10 October 2013. The National Archives.

1780 births
1850 deaths
British slave owners
People educated at Harrow School
19th-century British businesspeople